The Downer Channel is an American sketch comedy television series that aired from July 24 until August 14, 2001.

Premise
Four comedians appear in a combination of sketches and reality-based segments.

Cast
Jeff B. Davis as various characters
Wanda Sykes as various characters
Mary Lynn Rajskub as various characters
Lance Krall as various characters

Episodes

References

External links
 
TV Guide
 

2001 American television series debuts
2001 American television series endings
2000s American sketch comedy television series
English-language television shows
NBC original programming
Television series by Universal Television